FK Napredok is a football club from Kičevo, North Macedonia. They are currently competing in the Macedonian Third League (West Division).

History
The club was founded in 1928, under the name Jadran. After World War II, it had the name Jančica until 1952 when it got its current name FK Napredok. Team colors are blue and white, while its biggest accomplishment was finalist in the 2003–04 Macedonian Cup.

Supporters
FK Napredok supporters are called  the Gjaoli (Devils).

Honours
 Macedonian Second League:
Winners (1): 1998–99
Runners-up (3): 1995–96, 2000–01, 2005–06

 Macedonian Football Cup:
 Runners-up (1): 2003–04

Recent seasons

1The 2019–20 and 2020–21 seasons were abandoned due to the COVID-19 pandemic in North Macedonia.

Historical list of coaches

 Ilija Dimoski (1999)
 Jovan Manakovski (2000 - 2001)
 Naum Ljamcevski (2001 - 2002)
 Dragan Bočeski (2003)
 Zoran Gjorgieski (2004 - 2005)
 Dragan Bočeski (1 Jul 2005 - 30 Jun 2008)
 Dragan Mateski (1 Jul 2008 - 16 Dec 2008)
 Dragan Bočeski (17 Dec 2008 - Jun 2009)
 Baze Lazarevski (Jul 2009 - 5 Mar 2010)
 Dragan Bočeski (6 Mar 2010 - 27 Jun 2013)
 Gordan Zdravkov (Jul 2013 - Aug 2013)
 Gorazd Mihajlov (23 Aug 2013 - 28 Dec 2013)
 Dragan Mateski (25 Mar 2014 - 2015)

References

External links

Club info at MacedonianFootball 
Football Federation of Macedonia 

 
Napredok
Association football clubs established in 1928
1928 establishments in Yugoslavia